Mental health in the Republic of Ireland is the subject of state and community sector intervention in Ireland. The Irish state devolves responsibility for mental health to the Department of Health. Community groups and charities also provide support in the prevention and management of mental illness as well as suicide prevention.

Government strategy
, the Minister of State at the Department of Health with responsibility for Mental Health and Older People is Mary Butler, TD. Health services are delivered by the Health Service Executive (HSE).

National Suicide Research Foundation
The National Suicide Research Foundation leads research on the topic of suicidology.

Non-governmental organisations
A number of non-governmental organizations have historically been involved in delivery of health and educational services, including by religious orders and congregations. The impact of mental health services has been highlighted by research and media reports in recent decades, and a number of organisations have been created to deal with the area.

Amen
Amen (amen.ie) is a charity based in Navan, County Meath, which works with male victims of domestic violence. It dealt with over 3,600 contacts in 2009. The organisation was awarded a People of the Year Award and a GSK Ireland IMPACT Award in 2016.

Aware
Aware is a voluntary organisation which aims to assist people affected by depression. It was founded in 1985 by a group of patients, relatives and health professionals.

Console
Console was a charity that offered suicide bereavement services including a 24/7 Suicide Helpline, Suicide Bereavement Liaison Service and a Suicide Bereavement Counselling Service. Its founder, Paul Kelly, received a People of the Year Awards, award in 2014. Reports emerged in 2016 that the charity was mismanaged and the charity closed. Campaigner David Hall was appointed interim CEO during the winding-down process. A national Charities Regulator was appointed in the same year.

Cycle Against Suicide
Cycle Against Suicide is an organisation that seeks to raise awareness and bring support to those dealing with mental health issues. A compilation album Simple Things was released in 2013 for the charity.

Men's sheds

The Irish Association of Men's Sheds is a non-profit organization which promotes good mental health through creating sheds for men to meet and create projects in. Projects, as varied as woodwork, electronics and jam-making, are chosen by the participants. The organisation was awarded a People of the Year Award. More than 10,000 men use over 300 sheds.

Nightline
Nightline is the name given to various confidential and anonymous overnight listening, emotional support, information, and supplies services, run by students for students at universities around the world.  Individual Nightlines are autonomous organisations, but are affiliated to the Nightline Association, which is an umbrella organisation founded to facilitate cooperation between Nightlines in the UK and Ireland.

Pieta House
Pieta House deals with suicide prevention and counselling for those bereaved by suicide. The annual Darkness into Light event at locations across Ireland and the world act as a fundraiser for the charity.

Other organisations
The Brothers Hospitallers of Saint John of God have run institutions in Ireland since 1882. The Samaritans charity also runs a helpline for suicide prevention. SOSAD ("Save Our Sons And Daughters") Ireland is a suicide prevention and bereavement agency which was set up in 2006.

Youth mental health
Jigsaw is the National Centre for Youth Mental Health. ReachOut.com deals with young people aged 12 to 25. Childline runs a helpline and online chat service for those under 18. BodyWhys offers online support centring on eating disorder issues. Children at Risk In Ireland (CARI) is an organisation that primarily provides therapy and counselling to victims of child sexual abuse.

Mental health among males 
At this current time in Ireland, there is a push to nullify the stigma towards mental health and raise awareness of the widespread epidemic of mental health issues among males (over four in five suicides in Ireland are male)

See also 
 Healthcare in the Republic of Ireland
 Suicide in Ireland

References 

 
Ireland
Human rights in Ireland